"The Best Thing I Ever Did" is a song recorded by South Korean girl group Twice. It was released by JYP Entertainment on December 12, 2018, as the lead single from the group's third special album, The Year of "Yes" (2018).

Composition
"The Best Thing I Ever Did" was composed by J.Y. Park "The Asiansoul", Park Ji-min, Jinri (Full8loom), Glory Face (Full8loom), Sophia Pae, Lee Woo-min "collapsedone" and Justin Reinstein, with lyrics by J.Y. Park "The Asiansoul", Park Ji-min and Jinri (Full8loom). The song was classified as an alternative R&B song, which mixes Twice's distinctive pop sound to create a "warm winter sensibility." The holiday-inspired track lyrically describes the memory of meeting a loved one during the holiday season. The song was noted to be Twice's first instance of featuring the R&B genre. Running for 3 minutes and 32 seconds, the song is composed in the key of F major with a tempo of 105 beats per minute.

Music video
On December 8, the first music video teaser for "The Best Thing I Ever Did" was released. A second teaser was uploaded on the following day. The music video was released on December 12, 2018.

Japanese version
The Japanese version of "Best Thing I Ever Did" was released as part of B-side for "Happy Happy" on July 17, 2019. The lyrics were written by Natsumi Watanabe.

In July 2020, JYP Entertainment announced Twice's release of their third compilation album named #Twice3 for September 16. The album, containing twelve tracks with both Korean and Japanese versions of six songs, also includes "The Best Thing I Ever Did".

Critical response
Tanu Raj of NME described the song as a "delightful track (that) turns a characteristic lonely season into one of companionship and love".

Commercial performance
"The Best Thing I Ever Did" debuted at number 27 of the Gaon Digital Chart and at number 22 on the Billboard K-pop Hot 100. The song also peaked at number 15 on Billboard's World Digital Song Sales and at number 67 on Japan Hot 100 charts.

Track listing
Digital download / streaming
"The Best Thing I Ever Did"  – 3:32

Personnel
Credits adapted from Melon.

 Twice – lead vocals
 J.Y. Park – composer, lyrics, arrangement
 Park Ji-min – composer, lyrics
 Jinri – composer, lyrics
 Glory Face – composer
 Sophia Pae – composer
 Lee Woo-min – composer
 Justin Reinstein – composer
 Lee Hae Sol – arrangement

Charts

References

2018 singles
2018 songs
Twice (group) songs
Korean-language songs
JYP Entertainment singles
Songs written by Park Jin-young